Hayesville may refer to:

Hayesville, Iowa, a small city in Keokuk County, Iowa
Hayesville, North Carolina, a town in Clay County, near the Georgia North Carolina border
Hayesville, North Carolina (Township), One of 6 townships in Clay County, North Carolina
Hayesville, Ohio, a village in Ashland County
Hayesville, Pickaway County, Ohio, an unincorporated community
Hayesville, Oregon, an unincorporated community in North West Oregon
Hayesville, Pennsylvania, a populated area in Lower Oxford, Pennsylvania.